Jacek Bielski (born 29 January 1972) is a Polish boxer. He competed in the men's light welterweight event at the 1996 Summer Olympics.

References

1972 births
Living people
Polish male boxers
Olympic boxers of Poland
Boxers at the 1996 Summer Olympics
People from Elbląg
Sportspeople from Warmian-Masurian Voivodeship
Light-welterweight boxers
20th-century Polish people
21st-century Polish people